Thandalam is a small village near the town of Neyyattinkara in the district of Thiruvananthapuram in the Indian state of Kerala.

References

Villages in Thiruvananthapuram district